A harpoon is a long spear-like instrument and tool used in fishing, whaling, sealing, and other marine hunting to catch and injure large fish or marine mammals such as seals and whales. It accomplishes this task by impaling the target animal and securing it with barb or toggling claws, allowing the fishermen to use a rope or chain attached to the projectile to catch the animal. A harpoon can also be used as a weapon. Certain harpoons are made with different builds to perform better with the type of target being aimed at. For example, the Inuit have short, fixed foreshaft harpoons for hunting seals at their breathing holes while loose shafted ones are made for attaching to the game thrown at.

History

In the 1990s, harpoon points, known as the Semliki harpoons or the Katanda harpoons, were found in the Katanda region in Zaire (called the Democratic Republic of the Congo today). As the earliest known harpoons, these weapons were made and used 90,000 years ago, most likely to spear catfishes. Later, in Japan, spearfishing with poles (harpoons) was widespread in palaeolithic times, especially during the Solutrean and Magdalenian periods. Cosquer Cave in Southern France contains cave art over 16,000 years old, including drawings of seals which appear to have been harpooned.

There are references to harpoons in ancient literature; though, in most cases, the descriptions do not go into detail. An early example can be found in the Bible in Job 41:7 (NIV): "Can you fill its hide with harpoons or its head with fishing spears?" The Greek historian Polybius (c. 203 BC – 120 BC), in his Histories, describes hunting for swordfish by using a harpoon with a barbed and detachable head. Copper harpoons were known to the seafaring Harappans well into antiquity. Early hunters in India include the Mincopie people, aboriginal inhabitants of India's Andaman and Nicobar islands, who have used harpoons with long cords for fishing since early times.

Whaling
The two flue harpoon was the primary weapon used in whaling around the world, but it tended to penetrate no deeper than the soft outer layer of blubber. Thus it was often possible for the whale to escape by struggling or swimming away forcefully enough to pull the shallowly embedded barbs out backwards. This flaw was corrected in the early nineteenth century with the creation of the one flue harpoon; by removing one of the flues, the head of the harpoon was narrowed, making it easier for it to penetrate deep enough to hold fast. In the Arctic, the indigenous people used the more advanced toggling harpoon design. In the mid-19th century, the toggling harpoon was adapted by Lewis Temple, using iron. The Temple toggle was widely used, and quickly came to dominate whaling.

In the novel Moby-Dick, Herman Melville explained the reason for the harpoon's effectiveness:

He also describes another device that was at times a necessary addition to harpoons:

Explosive harpoons

The first use of explosives in the hunting of whales was made by the British South Sea Company in 1737, after some years of declining catches. A large fleet was sent, armed with cannon-fired harpoons. Although the weaponry was successful in killing the whales, most of the catch sank before being retrieved. However, the system was still occasionally used, and underwent successive improvements at the hands of various inventors over the next century, including Abraham Stagholt in the 1770s and George Manby in the early 19th century.

William Congreve, who invented some of the first rockets for British Army use, designed a rocket-propelled whaling harpoon in the 1820s. The shell was designed to explode on contact and impale the whale with the harpoon. The weapon was in turn attached by a line to the boat, and the hope was that the explosion would generate enough gas within the whale to keep it afloat for retrieval. Expeditions were sent out to try this new technology; many whales were killed, but most of them sank. These early devices, called bomb lances, became widely used for the hunting of humpbacks and right whales. A notable user of these early explosive harpoons was the American Thomas Welcome Roys in 1865, who set up a shore station in Seydisfjördur, Iceland. A slump in oil prices after the American Civil War forced their endeavor into bankruptcy in 1867. 

An early version of the explosive harpoon was designed by Jacob Nicolai Walsøe, a Norwegian painter and inventor. His 1851 application was rejected by the interior ministry on the grounds that he had received public funding for his experiments. In 1867, a Danish fireworks manufacturer, Gaetano Amici, patented a cannon-fired harpoon, and in the same year, an Englishman, George Welch, patented a grenade harpoon very similar to the version which transformed whaling in the following decade.

In 1870, the Norwegian shipping magnate Svend Foyn patented and pioneered the modern exploding whaling harpoon and gun. Foyn had studied the American method in Iceland. His basic design is still in use today. He perceived the failings of other methods and solved these problems in his own system. He included, with the help of H.M.T. Esmark, a grenade tip that exploded inside the whale. This harpoon design also utilized a shaft that was connected to the head with a moveable joint. His original cannons were muzzle-loaded with special padding and also used a unique form of gunpowder. The cannons were later replaced with safer breech-loading types. 

Together with the steam-powered whale catcher, this development ushered in the modern age of commercial whaling. Euro-American whalers were now equipped to hunt faster and more powerful species, such as the rorquals. Because rorquals sank when they died, later versions of the exploding harpoon injected air into the carcass to keep it afloat.

The modern whaling harpoon consists of a deck-mounted launcher (mostly a cannon) and a projectile which is a large harpoon with an explosive (penthrite) charge, attached to a thick rope. The spearhead is shaped in a manner which allows it to penetrate the thick layers of whale blubber and stick in the flesh. It has sharp spikes to prevent the harpoon from sliding out. Thus, by pulling the rope with a motor, the whalers can drag the whale back to their ship.

A recent development in harpoon technology is the hand-held speargun.  Divers use the speargun for spearing fish.  They may also be used for defense against dangerous marine animals.  Spearguns may be powered by pressurized gas or with mechanical means like springs or elastic bands.

Space
The Philae spacecraft carried harpoons for helping the probe anchor itself to the surface of comet 67P/Churyumov–Gerasimenko. However, the harpoons failed to fire.

See also

 Hawaiian sling
 Kakivak
 Leister
 Speargun
 Trident

Notes

References
Lødingen Local History Society (1986) Yearbook Lødingen. The modern history of whaling,  .
Lødingen local historical society (1999/2000) Yearbook Lødingen. More about Jacob Nicolai Walsøe, granatharpunens inventor, .
 Information about Erik Eriksen based on The Discovery of King Karl Land, Spitsbergen, by Adolf Hoel, The Geographical Review Vol. XXV, No. 3, July, 1935, Pp. 476–478, American Geographical Society, Broadway AT 156th Street, New York" and Store norske leksikon, Aschehoug & Gyldendal (Great Norwegian Encyclopedia, last edition)
 F.R. Allchin in South Asian Archaeology 1975: Papers from the Third International Conference of the Association of South Asian Archaeologists in Western Europe, Held in Paris (December 1979) edited by J.E.van Lohuizen-de Leeuw. Brill Academic Publishers, Incorporated. Pages 106–118. .
 Edgerton; et al. (2002). Indian and Oriental Arms and Armour. Courier Dover Publications. .
 Ray, Himanshu Prabha (2003). The Archaeology of Seafaring in Ancient South Asia. Cambridge University Press. .

External links
Whalecraft: Harpoons

 
Fishing equipment
Personal weapons
Projectile weapons
Ancient weapons
Inuit tools